see Bienvenidos (Programa de televisión chileno)
Bienvenidos (English: Welcome) was a Chilean morning show currently broadcast on Canal 13 since March 7, 2011 to November 10, 2021. It airs every Monday to Friday at 08:00 (CLT). He was currently led by Tonka Tomicic and Amaro Gómez-Pablos.

Team

Presenters 

Amaro Gómez-Pablos
Tonka Tomicic

Panelists 

 Sergio Lagos
 Raquel Argandoña
 Gonzalo Müller
 Ángeles Araya
 "Polo" Ramírez
 Carlos Zárate

Production 

 Daniel Sagüés (Executive Producer and Director)
 Carla Tafall (Journalistic editor and content director)

Journalists 

 Marilyn Pérez
 Martín Herrera
 Franco Lasagna
 Leo Castillo

Specialists 

 Carolina Herrera (Doctor)
 Michelle Adam (Meteorologist)

Awards and nominations

External links 
  

2011 Chilean television series debuts
Canal 13 (Chilean TV channel) original programming
Breakfast television